The 2021–22 Ardal SE season (also known as the 2021–22 Floodlighting and Electrical Services Ardal SE season for sponsorship reasons) was the first season of the new third-tier southern region football in Welsh football pyramid, part of the Ardal Leagues, after the cancellation of the previous season due to the COVID-19 pandemic in Wales.

Teams
The league was made up of 16 teams competing for one automatic promotion place to Cymru South, whilst the second-placed team qualified for a play-off with the second-placed team of Ardal SW. Three teams were relegated to Tier 4.

Stadia and locations

Source: Ardal SE Ground Information

League table

Results

References

External links
Football Association of Wales
Ardal Southern Leagues
Ardal Southern Twitter Page
Tier 3 Rules & Regulations

2021–22 in Welsh football
Ardal Leagues